A pièce d'occasion like the word pièce meaning preparing and d'occasion meaning for special occasion suggests pis a composition, dance or theatrical piece composed, often commissioned, for a festive occasion.

Examples 

 The Dying Swan, ballet by Mikhail Fokine (to Camille Saint-Saëns's cello solo Le cygne) for the ballerina Anna Pavlova (1905)
 Fanfare for a Prince, ballet by John Taras (1956)
 Dance Preludes, ballet by Miriam Mahdaviani (1991)
 FOR 4, dance by Christopher Wheeldon (to Franz Schubert's Death and the Maiden) (2006)
 Silla, opera seria by Handel (1713)
 Elvida, opera by Gaetano Donizetti (1826)
 Entrez, messieurs, mesdames, pièce d'occasion by Offenbach (1855)
 Les dragées du baptême, pièce d'occasion by Offenbach (1856)
 La statue retrouvée (1923), an entertainment for a private costume ball in Paris with music by Erik Satie, scenario by Jean Cocteau, designs by Pablo Picasso and choreography by Leonide Massine.
 How He Lied to Her Husband, playlet by George Bernard Shaw (1905).

See also 
 Occasional poetry

References

Musical composition
Ballet terminology